Folk and Fairy Tales is a 1978 anthology of 25 fairy tales from around the world that have been collected and retold by Ruth Manning-Sanders. In fact, the book is mostly a collection of tales published in previous Manning-Sanders anthologies. Stories are pulled from A Book of Dragons, A Book of Mermaids, A Book of Witches, A Book of Dwarfs, A Book of Devils and Demons, A Book of Kings and Queens, A Book of Magic Animals, A Book of Giants, A Book of Ogres and Trolls, A Book of Wizards, A Book of Enchantments and Curses and A Book of Monsters.

There are also five previously unpublished stories. (Numbers 21 through 25 in the table of contents.)

It is preceded by the anthology A Choice of Magic (1971), another collection of (mostly) previously published Manning-Sanders tales.

Table of contents
Introduction
1. My Lord Bag of Rice (Japan)
2. Merman Rosmer (Scotland)
3. The Old Witch (England)
4. The Skipper and the Dwarfs (Jutland)
5. Something Wonderful (Finland)
6. Selim and the Snake Queen (Greek Isles)
7. Jon and His Brothers (French Canada)
8. The Monster with Seven Heads (Madagascar)
9. The Giant Who Had No Heart in His Body (Norway)
10. The Little Tailor and the Three Dogs (Germany)
11. The Silver Penny (Hungary)
12. Vasilissa Most Lovely (Russia)
13. Fin M'Coul and Cucullin (Ireland)
14. King Josef (Czechoslovakia)
15. Long, Broad and Sharpsight (Bohemia)
16. The Knights of the Fish (Spain)
17. The Girl in the Basket (Italy)
18. The Monster in the Mill (Macedonia)
19. The Lost Prince (Iceland)
20. Lilla Rosa (Sweden)
21. Smoke Bones (North American Indian)
22. The Magic Roots (South America)
23. The Sailor and the Devil (Holland)
24. Sausages (Transylvania)
25. The Caribou Wife (Alaska)

1978 children's books
1978 short story collections
Children's short story collections
British short story collections
Collections of fairy tales
Methuen Publishing books
1978 anthologies